The spire of Notre-Dame de Paris was located above the cross-section of the cathedral's transept. Notre-Dame de Paris has had two timber spires, known as flèches. The first was built between 1220 and 1230. It eventually became so damaged that it was removed in the late 18th century. The second was put into place by the French architect Eugène Viollet-le-Duc in 1859, and destroyed in a major fire on 15 April 2019.

History

Chronology

The original spire
The original spire was built from 1220 to 1230. It was supported by an "ingenious" and "well designed" system of frames, according to an examination of its remains after it was taken down. All of the spire's weight rested on the four pillars of the transept. This spire also functioned as a bell tower.

In March 1606, the large cross at the top of the spire and the relics that were inside it fell due to wind and decay. The rest of the spire began to collapse due to the ravages of time in the middle of the 18th century, and it was taken down from 1786 to 1792.

The second spire

The cathedral remained without a spire for several decades until a restoration effort was begun by Jean-Baptiste Antoine Lassus. After Lassus's death in 1857, the project was taken over by Eugène Viollet-le-Duc. The new spire's design was inspired by that of the Orléans Cathedral (which was in turn modeled on the spire of the Amiens Cathedral). The wooden base of the structure was made by the carpenter Auguste Bellu (who had also worked on the Orléans Cathedral), and the lead covering was made by the Ateliers Monduit.

The spire was unveiled 18 August 1859. Its lead covering weighed some 250 tons. Its wooden structure was carved from oak from Champagne.

Statues of the Twelve Apostles, made in the style of the 13th century, surrounded the spire at its base. Each of the four sections of the roof had a row of three Apostles, standing one behind the other and staggered by height. In front of each group was another statue of a sign of the Tetramorph symbolizing the Four Evangelists: the bull for St. Luke, the lion for St. Mark, the eagle for St. John and the angel for St. Matthew. Each grouping faced one of the four cardinal directions. All of the statues look out over Paris except for St. Thomas, the patron saint of architects. He was looking towards the spire as if contemplating it. Viollet-le-Duc was the model for the statue of St. Thomas.
At the base of the central support beam of the spire, an iron plaque dedicated to the achievement of the workers was inscribed with the image of a compass and a try square. These were the symbols of the mason's guild and a subtle reference to God's role as Great Architect of the Universe in Catholic tradition. Because both Viollet-le-Duc and Bellu are both mentioned by name on the plaque, it has been theorized that they were Freemasons.

It contained three relics: a small piece of the crown of thorns, a relic of St. Denis, and a relic of St. Geneviève. The piece of the crown of thorns was put into the rooster by Viollet-le-Duc himself in 1860.

Destruction by fire

An operation to restore the spire began on 11 April 2019, as part of a larger restoration of the cathedral which would last ten years and cost an estimated 60 million euros. While one pair was being worked on the other fourteen statues would still be on display within the cathedral.

On 15 April 2019, around 6:50 pm, a fire began in the eaves of the cathedral. Rapidly the fire spread to the rest of the roof. The heat, estimated to be more than  made the lead coating melt into the wood of the spire, which did not prevent it from burning. The fire emitted toxic fumes so neighboring areas were evacuated.

The upper part of the spire collapsed around 7:45 pm. Its fall caused the destruction of part of the vaults of the nave. The collapse of the tower caused the destruction of the crossing of the transept.

The sixteen statues around the spire had been taken down four days earlier and sent off to be restored. They were not affected by the fire. However, the rooster at the top of the spire became detached during the fall. Thought to be lost, It was found damaged but mainly intact in the debris the following day. It was sent to join the statues at Socra, a French art conservation society for repair.

Future spire
On 17 April 2019 the French Prime Minister Édouard Philippe announced the launch of an international architecture competition to design a new spire. It is in part a competition to define the nature of the reconstruction effort and answer the question: Should the new spire be identical to the old, or a new design entirely?

The architect Jean Nouvel called for the faithful reconstruction of the original spire, saying that "it was an integral part of the Cathedral". In the following days, several architecture firms released new proposals for the Spire. Foster and Partners of London proposed a new roof and spire made of stainless steel and crystal, while the French architecture firm Godart + Roussel Architectes of Dijon proposed a structure made of glass panels and copper tiles.

Ultimately, however, it was decided that the spire's exterior will be reconstructed to match the 19th-century design by Viollet-le-Duc.

In popular culture

Cinema
 In the 1996 Disney animated film The Hunchback of Notre Dame, Quasimodo climbs the spire while singing "Out There". The film takes place in 1482, but the spire matches the appearance of the one built in the 19th century.

Video game
 Viollet-le-Duc's spire appeared in the 2014 action-adventure video game Assassin's Creed Unity, developed by Ubisoft Montréal. The depiction of the spire was very detailed and the player could even climb it. The game is set during the French Revolution so the presence of the 19th-century spire is an anachronism. This was done intentionally, because a  representation of the original spire, which at that time was damaged and being dismantled, would have been jarring for players.

References

Notre-Dame de Paris
Former buildings and structures in Paris
Collapsed buildings and structures
Towers in Paris